Pedro Hernández Calderón (born 21 June 1981) is a former football goalkeeper who last played for Irapuato FC on loan from Club Atlas.

Club career
After several seasons as a back-up goalkeeper, Hernandez began the Clausura 2009 as the first choice goalkeeper for Atlas.

Atlas loaned Hernández to Club Necaxa in 2009, and he returned to the club on another six-month loan in December 2010.

Hernandez played the 2010 Bicentenario Final with Necaxa in which they defeated Leon 4–2 in the global score.

References

External links
 
 

1981 births
Living people
Mexican footballers
Santos Laguna footballers
Atlas F.C. footballers
Irapuato F.C. footballers
Club Necaxa footballers
Association football goalkeepers